The Comet is a pair of bus services operated by Uno. The services are numbered 614 and 644.

History
In March 2017, routes 614 and 644 were extended from Hatfield Business Park to Hatfield railway station, replacing service 600 which was simultaneously withdrawn.

The Comet brand was introduced in September 2017, coinciding with the introduction of six new Alexander Dennis Enviro400 City double-decker buses.

Routes 
Route 614 starts in Queensbury and passes through Chipping Barnet and Edgware, though it avoids Edgware bus station. It subsequently runs on the A1(M) motorway before reaching Hatfield, where it passes the University of Hertfordshire. The route ends at Hatfield railway station. Route 644 takes a similar route, but instead of passing through Edgware, it instead passes through Borehamwood.

Etymology
The routes are named after the de Havilland Comet, the world's first commercial jet airliner. The airliner was developed at the Hatfield Aerodrome.

References

Bus routes in England
2017 establishments in England
Transport in Hertfordshire